The National Security Agency (NSA) or Bahrain Intelligence Agency (BIA1) is an investigating authority in Bahrain that is associated with but not formally part of the Ministry of the Interior. The NSA was formed after King Hamad issued Decree No. 14 of 2002 declaring it as the replacement of the General Directorate for State Security Investigations. The NSA was granted the power to make arrests by a 2008 royal decree, and lost this power in 2011, again by royal decree.

History
Before 2002, the NSA was organized as the 'General Directorate for State Security Investigations', also known as 'Security and Intelligence Service'. It was headed by Ian Henderson from 1966 to 1998. After Henderson retired in 1998, the position was taken by Khalid bin Mohammed Al Khalifa, a nephew of the then-ruler Isa bin Salman Al Khalifa.

Adel Flaifel served in the organization until 2002.

Directors 
The NSA director is appointed by the King, has cabinet rank, and is a member of the Supreme Defence Council along with the Minister of Interior. According to the BCHR and opposition, senior positions of the NSA are occupied by relatives of the King, the majority of the agency's employees are non-Bahraini citizens and, despite being a majority of Bahrain's population, Shi'ites make up only 4% of the NSA's employees.

The current president of the NSA is Talal bin Mohammed bin Khalifa Al Khalifa, who was appointed on 4 August 2016. Talal bin Mohammed is the son of Mohammed bin Khalifa Al Khalifa who served as the Interior Minister of Bahrain for 31 years (1973–2004), and is the grandson of Khalifa bin Hamad Al Khalifa, the former Director General of Police & Public Security (1937–1961). Talal's great grandfather was the ruler of Bahrain Hamad ibn Isa Al Khalifa (1872–1942). Talal is the brother of Fawaz bin Mohammed Al Khalifa, the current ambassador of Bahrain to the United Kingdom.

Prior to Talal bin Mohammed's appointment, the director of the NSA was Major-General Adel bin Khalifa bin Hamad Al Fadhel. Adel bin Khalifa was appointed on 28 November 2011 to fill a vacancy created when the former director, Khalifa bin Abdullah Al Khalifa, was promoted to the position of Secretary General of the Supreme Defense Council. Khalifa bin Abdullah is a cousin of King Hamad and a member of the Al Khalifa royal family of Bahrain. Khalifa bin Abdullah was appointed on 23 March 2008, prior to which he was serving as Bahrain's ambassador to London. He was previously the acting CEO of Bahrain Radio and Television Corporation and director of Press and Foreign Media Relations.

Prior to Khalifa bin Abdullah, the position of NSA director was occupied by another cousin of the King, Khalifa bin Ali bin Rashid Al Khalifa, who was appointed in September 2005, and is the current ambassador to London. The first director of the NSA was another cousin of the King, Abdul Aziz bin Atiyatallah Al Khalifa, who was appointed by the King in May 2002.

Bahrain NSA chiefs

References

2002 establishments in Bahrain
Bahraini intelligence agencies
Government agencies of Bahrain